The 1950 All-Big Seven Conference football team consists of American football players chosen by various organizations for All-Big Seven Conference teams for the 1950 college football season.  The selectors for the 1950 season included the United Press (UP).

All-Big Seven selections

Backs
 Bill Weeks, Iowa State (UP-1)
 Wade Stinson, Kansas (UP-1)
 Bobby Reynolds, Nebraska (UP-1)
 Leon Heath, Oklahoma (UP-1)

Ends
 Jim Doran, Iowa State (UP-1)
 Frank Anderson, Oklahoma (uP-1)

Tackles
 Jim Weatherall, Oklahoma (UP-1)
 Mike McCormack, Kansas (UP-1)

Guards
 Norm McNabb, Oklahoma (UP-1)
 John Kadlec, Missouri (UP-1)

Centers
 Harry Moore, Oklahoma (UP-1)

Key
UP = United Press

See also
1950 College Football All-America Team

References

All-Big Seven Conference football team
All-Big Eight Conference football teams